This is a list of State Protected Monument in India as officially reported by and available through the website of the Archaeological Survey of India in the Indian state Andhra Pradesh. The monument identifier is a combination of the abbreviation of the subdivision of the list (state, ASI circle) and the numbering as published on the website of the ASI. 500 State Protected Monuments have been recognized by the ASI in Andhra Pradesh. Besides the State Protected Monuments, also the Monuments of National Importance in this state might be relevant.

List of state protected monuments 

|}

See also
 List of Monuments of National Importance in Andhra Pradesh
 List of State Protected Monuments in Telangana (a state formed in 2014)
 State Protected Monuments of India

References

External links

AP Archaeology Museum

Andhra Pradesh
Lists of tourist attractions in Andhra Pradesh